Ustaad is a 1999 Indian Malayalam-language action thriller film directed by Sibi Malayil and written by Ranjith. The film was produced by Ranjith and Shaji Kailas. The plot follows Parameshwaran (Mohanlal), a soft-spoken businessman who leads a double life as an underworld don named Ustaad, he takes care of his younger sister Padmaja (Divyaa Unni), his only family. The film also features Indraja, Narendra Prasad, N. F. Varghese, Rajeev, and Vineeth.

The songs were composed by Vidyasagar and Thej Mervin, while C. Rajamani provided the background score. Ustaad was released on 26 March 1999. The film was a commercial success at the box office and ran over 100 days in theatres, becoming one of the highest-grossing Malayalam films of the year.

Plot

Ustaad is a powerful crime boss in Mumbai, who decides to stop everything and settle down in his home town with his sister Padmaja. Before he leaves, Ustaad sends Sami and Sethu to Yousuf Shah Associates to withdraw his share. However, Yousuf Shah is not ready to give him a single penny. When Sulaiman, Yousuf's manager, creates a problem, Ustaad uses to take his share of the money by force. In Kozhikode, Ustaad is merely Parameshwaran, an adorable brother and guardian to his younger sister Padmaja. He maintains a low profile as a businessman who has ventured into real estate.

Padmaja has fallen in love with her friend Nandan, who is the son of Koliyodan Shekharan, a businessman who has not been doing so well, mainly because of the extravagant lifestyle of his older son Koliyodan Giri. Mohan Thampy, Shekharan's son-in-law, is a business tycoon and a politician as well. Originally, Thampy was helped financially by Shekharan, but over time, he was more involved with the underworld, which causes the duo to have a strained relationship. Varsha, a newly appointed city commissioner, does not like Parameshwaran.

Meanwhile, Padmaja wants to marry Nandan, to which Parameshwaran gives his approval. The night before the wedding, Parameshwaran is arrested by Varsha for gold smuggling. He learns that his arrest was set up by Yousuf Shah and Thampy. Varsha later realizes her mistake, and vows to support Parameshwaran. Thampy then devises a plan to vanquish Ustaad, and  force Padmaja to vow her properties to help her father-in-law, who has a large debt to Thampy.

As a mediator, Thampy gives some money to Giri and advise him to keep it on Nandan's office room and will inform the police and make Nandan and Padmaja arrest for money laundering. This enrages Ustaad, who finds Thampy is in the protection of a minister. He makes him speak all the truth in front of Varsha. Later Yousuf threatens Ustaad by telling him that he will kill his sister by bomb and breaks his right hand. Ustaad hunts down Yousuf Shah, who flees to Dubai, and finally defeats him in the desert. He flies back to join his sister and family.

Cast

Production
The song "Theerchayilla Janam" was filmed at the AVM Studio in Chennai, for which a set was constructed resembling a bar. It was choreographed by Kala. The song was sung by Mohanlal and featured himself along with dancers, club members, and the villains.

Soundtrack
The songs soundtrack was composed by  Vidyasagar and Thej Mervin ("Thirchayilla"). The lyrics were by Gireesh Puthenchery and Kannan Pareekutty ("Theerchayilla").

Reception
Neenu Abraham of Deccan Herald wrote that "With the exception of Mohan Lal, that classic Malayil touch seems to be missing here. Which is not to say that it is a bad film. It did have its light-hearted moments lent by all-time favourite Innocent. But the next time Malayil decides on producing a film, he better keep to his old style".

Ustaad was successful at the box office running for more than 100 days in many releasing centres . Mohanlal's "മേം ഹൂം ഉസ്താദ് " (Mem hum Ustaad) dialogue and his ustad cap was a cult sensation in Kerala. The movie was speculated to be an inspiration for the 2015 Tamil movie Vedalam.

References

External links
 

1999 films
1990s Malayalam-language films
1990s action drama films
Indian action drama films
Films with screenplays by Ranjith
Films scored by Vidyasagar
Films about organised crime in India
Indian gangster films
Films shot at Varikkasseri Mana
Films shot in Ottapalam
Films shot in Kozhikode
Films shot in Mumbai
Films directed by Sibi Malayil